Andy On (born May 11, 1977) is an American actor and martial artist.

Life and career
On was born on May 11, 1977, in Providence, Rhode Island. He is a native of the US, and can speak English, Mandarin, and a bit of Cantonese.

Andy On did not graduate from high school. He worked as a bartender in Rhode Island. While doing this, he was approached by China Star founder Charles Heung and filmmaker Tsui Hark to take over the role of one of Jet Li's film characters, Black Mask, in Black Mask 2: City of Masks (2002). He had no martial arts background. Director Tsui Hark had to send Andy to Shaolin Temple one month for training. He even received some guidance from Jet Li himself. Despite the poor reviews and the bad box office ratings, On continued to act, improving in both martial arts and acting. Like fellow Hong Kong film star Nicholas Tse, On trained in martial arts under Chung Chi Li, the leader of the Jackie Chan Stunt Team. On began training with Chan in 2001 for the film Looking for Mister Perfect/Kei fung dik sau (2003), which was released two years later. On trained in wushu at the Shaolin Temple and studied film fighting under former Jackie Chan Stunt Team leader Nicky Li for his first film, Looking for Mister Perfect, which was shot before Black Mask 2: City of Masks, but released one year later, in 2003. On continued his acting career with many injuries, sustaining a hamstring injury on the set of New Police Story (2004) in one of the two fights against Jackie Chan.

On was nominated and won the Hong Kong Film Award for Best New Actor Award for his role in Star Runner/Siu nin a Fu (2003). He shared the screen with the man who influenced him, Jackie Chan, in New Police Story. On has also won the Best New Artist Award in 2004 at the Hong Kong Film Awards for his role as Tank Wong in Siu nin a Fu, beating favorite Vanness Wu by only one-tenth of the votes.

Aside from his filmmaking career, On is also a singer. He has released some tracks, including a duet with Taiwanese pop singer Jolin Tsai called "Angel of Love". His hobbies are martial arts and video games. He continues to train in Wing Chun Kung Fu with good friend, actor, and martial artist Philip Ng, and has studied Thai boxing under former world kickboxing champion and actor Billy Chau in preparation for Star Runner.

During production of the film Three Kingdoms: Resurrection of the Dragon (2008), On was hit in the face by a stuntman during an action sequence. On cut his lip, and, after seven surgeries, sports a small scar on his lip. He considers the scar a "trophy" of his hard work in the film.

Personal life
On had a short-lived relationship with Coco Lee in which first started in June 2002. On dated model and actress Jennifer Tse from 2009 to 2013 before breaking up.

During the filming of Zombie Fight Club, On met actress Jessica Cambensy. The two began dating in November 2014. They became engaged in October 2015, a week after Jessica announced she was pregnant. Andy and Jessica became the parents of a 9-pound baby girl they named Tessa in March 2016. Andy and Jessica married on October 15, 2017, in a private ceremony in Hawaii. They later had a son Elvis, on June 19, 2018.

Filmography

Music videos
2002 – Coco Lee ("有你就够了")
2004 – Miriam Yeung ("处处吻")
2004 – Miriam Yeung ("柳媚花娇")

References

External links
Official blog of Andy On

Andy On at the Hong Kong Cinemagic

1977 births
Living people
Male actors from Rhode Island
American people of Hong Kong descent
Hong Kong male film actors
Hong Kong martial artists
Hong Kong people of Taiwanese descent
Actors from Providence, Rhode Island
21st-century Hong Kong male actors
American emigrants to Hong Kong
21st-century American male actors
American male actors of Taiwanese descent
American born Hong Kong artists